Peretychikha is a village (selo) in Terneysky District of Primorsky Krai, Russia, located on the Yedinka River near the Samarga River. Population: 136 (2002).

During the Soviet times, plans existed to connect Agzu, the most isolated settlement of Primorsky Krai, and Peretychikha with an autoroute.

The majority of Peretychikha's population is employed in the timber industry.

Rural localities in Primorsky Krai